Na Saeng can refer to several locations in Thailand
Na Saeng, Lampang
Na Saeng, Bueng Kan
Na Saeng, Roi Et
Na Saeng, Phetchabun